Greenvale Cricket Club is an Australian cricket team competing in the Victorian Premier Cricket competition.

The club began as the North Melbourne Cricket Club, and was one of the inaugural Victorian district cricket clubs in 1906/07. It played its home games at the Arden Street Oval in North Melbourne for many years.

In 1985/86, North Melbourne entered a trial amalgamation with the sub-district Geelong Cricket Club, which lasted for three seasons. Geelong has since established a premier cricket team in its own right.

In 2013, North Melbourne merged with turf cricket's Greenvale Cricket Club, to become the Greenvale Kangaroos. The club moved to the Greenvale Recreation Reserve in Greenvale from the 2013/14 season.

The club has never won a First XI district/premier cricket premiership in any form of the game; it and Frankston Peninsula, which joined the competition during the 1990s, are the only current clubs with this distinction.

References

Victorian Premier Cricket clubs
Cricket clubs in Melbourne
Sport in the City of Hume